Emiliano Elias Zapata (born August 12, 1986) is an Argentine football offensive midfielder .

Career
He has previously played in Argentine Torneo Argentino B, and in Primera B Metropolitana.

He started playing for the National Technological University Team in 2006. 
The same year he started training for Sportivo Belgrano, but his first official game was in April 2007 when he played a few minutes entering from the bench. During 2007–2008 he played 20 official matches scoring 13 goals.

In 2009, he moved to Buenos Aires and started playing for San Telmo where he played 24 official matches scoring 17 goals. And more than 30 non-official matches.

References
 * http://www.frsfco.utn.edu.ar/sae/areas/deportes/presentacion.asp sportivobelgranocba.com.ar * http:

Martelotto, Francisco  (2009). Sportivo Belgrano

Living people
1986 births
Argentine footballers
Association football midfielders
Sportivo Belgrano footballers
San Telmo footballers
Sportspeople from Entre Ríos Province